Blue Mountain School is an historic school located at 1986 Blue Mountain Road, about  southeast of Port Angeles, Washington. It has been moved shortly east of its original location in the early 20th century. The school operated from 1903 to the date of its closure in 1935 as the only educational facility in the Blue Mountain district. After closure, the Blue Mountain Cemetery Association continued to maintain and preserve the property.

Blue Mountain School was added to the National Historic Register in 1987.

References

School buildings completed in 1903
National Register of Historic Places in Port Angeles, Washington
1903 establishments in Washington (state)